Lotts Creek Township may refer to the following townships in the United States:

 Lotts Creek Township, Kossuth County, Iowa
 Lotts Creek Township, Ringgold County, Iowa

See also

 Lotts Creek
 Lotts (disambiguation)

Township name disambiguation pages